The Reserve Infantry Division of Hainan Provincial Military District() is a reserve infantry formation of the People's Liberation Army.

The division was activated in November 1993.

Since 2005 the division was composed of:
1st Regiment - Haikou, Hainan
2nd Regiment - Haikou, Hainan
Artillery Regiment - Danzhou, Hainan
1st Anti-Aircraft Artillery Regiment
2nd Anti-Aircraft Artillery Regiment - Haikou, Hainan

References

Reserve divisions of the People's Liberation Army
Military units and formations established in 1984